There are various mountains called Snow Mountain in the United States:

See also
 Snow Mountain Wilderness, California
 Mount Snow, Vermont, United States
 Snow Peak (disambiguation)
 Ice Mountain (disambiguation)
 An annual winter-long snow tubing event at Stone Mountain near Atlanta, Georgia
 Schneeberg (Alps) ("Snow Mountain" in German), a mountain in eastern Austria
 Xueshan ("Snow Mountain" in Chinese), the second highest mountain in Taiwan